Manchester United Women Football Club is a professional football club based in Leigh, Greater Manchester, England, that competes in the Women's Super League (WSL), the top tier of English women's football, after gaining promotion from the Championship at the end of the 2018–19 season.

History

1970s–2001: Unofficial team 
A team called Manchester United Supporters Club Ladies began operations in the late 1970s and was unofficially recognised as the club's senior women's team. They became founding members of the North West Women's Regional Football League in 1989. The team became increasingly competitive throughout the 90s at various levels of the FA Women's National League up until 2001.

2001–2005: Partnership and disbandment 

In 2001, the team formed an official partnership with Manchester United. However, the club began to stagnate with a string of successive mid-table finishes in the third division. The team were disbanded four years later, in 2005, shortly after Malcolm Glazer's completed takeover with the new regime deeming the women's team to not be part of the "core business" and unprofitable. A media spokesman for Manchester United also claimed the club wanted to focus on its women's academy instead of its senior team.

2018–present: Current team 

In March 2018, Manchester United announced their intentions to reintroduce a women's football team. Manchester United Women Football Club were founded on 28 May 2018, following the club's successful application to join the newly-formed 2018–19 FA Women's Championship. It marked the club's return to women's football after a thirteen-year absence; though the club's academy continued via the Manchester United Foundation, with the likes of Izzy Christiansen and Katie Zelem being produced by United's Centre of Excellence academy. Casey Stoney was appointed as the club's first head coach on 8 June, with their inaugural 21-player squad announced just over a month later.

The team's first game back was on 19 August 2018, where they won 1–0 in an away game against Liverpool in the FA Women's League Cup, with Lizzie Arnot scoring their first competitive goal in thirteen years. Three weeks later, their opening Championship encounter ended in a 12–0 victory away to Aston Villa. On 17 April 2019, United secured promotion to the FA Women's Super League following a 5–0 win against the same opposition. They clinched the FA Women's Championship title three days later following a 7–0 win at home to Crystal Palace. In May 2019, Manchester United were named FA Women's Championship Club of the Year at the 2019 FA Women’s Football Awards.

The 2019–20 season was the team's maiden FA WSL campaign. The season opener was a Manchester derby, held at the City of Manchester stadium. Manchester City won the match 1–0 in front of a then league record attendance of 31,213. United's first top-flight campaign was ended prematurely after the season was curtailed by the COVID-19 pandemic with the team awarded fourth place on a points per game basis. The last game was a 3–2 victory over Everton on 23 February 2020, with Leah Galton scoring twice and Ella Toone scoring once for Manchester United in the first game played at Everton's new Walton Hall Park stadium. In the FA Cup, Manchester United lost 3–2 to Manchester City in the fourth round, the first time they had lost in the first knockout round of a competition. However, they repeated their best League Cup finish by reaching the semi-finals for the second consecutive year, losing 1–0 to eventual cup winners Chelsea.

Manchester United Women played their first game at Old Trafford, against West Ham United, during the men's March 2021 international break. Manchester United won the game 2–0.

On 12 May 2021, Manchester United announced that Casey Stoney would stand down from her role as Head Coach at the end of the season. On 29 July 2021, Marc Skinner was announced as the new head coach on a two-year contract, with the option for a further year.

Ground 

Following the club's acceptance into the 2018–19 FA Women's Championship, it was revealed that the women's team would be based in Broughton, Salford at The Cliff training ground; subject to completion of redevelopment work. In the meantime United play their fixtures at Leigh Sports Village. Moss Lane serves as a backup venue for when Leigh Sports Village is unavailable. Ewen Fields has also been used as a contingency plan, hosting United’s FA Cup fifth round match against London Bees in February 2019. In March 2021, it was announced that the women's team would play their first ever game at Old Trafford later that month against West Ham United. In March 2022, the team played for the second time at Old Trafford and the first with fans present, beating Everton 3–1 in front of a club record 20,241 fans.

Players

Current squad

Out on loan

Player of the Year

Reserves and academy 
Despite not having a senior women's team for many years, Manchester United have continued to run a girls regional talent club up to under-16 level in accordance with FA regulations. The club's partner charity, The Manchester United Foundation, also works in coaching girls at all ages across the Greater Manchester region. Ahead of the 2019–20 season, Manchester United entered a full-time U21 team into the FA WSL Academy League for the first time, managed by Charlotte Healy. The club's development team had contested the WSL Academy Cup final against Arsenal the previous season.

Under-21 squad

Out on loan

Manager history 
  Charlotte Healy (2019–present)

Honours 
 FA WSL Academy League National Champions: 1
 2021–22
 FA WSL Academy League Northern Division: 1
 2021–22
 FA WSL Academy Cup: 1
 2021–22

Academy graduates 
The following is a list of academy players who have made senior team appearances. Bold indicates the player is still at the club.
  Carrie Jones
  Ella Toone
  Emily Ramsey
  Fran Bentley
  Karna Solskjær
  Katie Zelem
  Kirsty Hanson
  Millie Turner
  Naomi Hartley
  Rebecca May
  Tara Bourne

Coaching staff

First-team

Academy

Higher management

Managerial statistics 
Information correct as of 19 March 2023. Only competitive matches are counted.

Honours 
 FA Women's Championship
 Winners: 2018–19

Seasons

Key 

 GS = Group stage
 QF = Quarter-finals
 SF = Semi-finals

Season summary

Records

Notes

References

External links 

  
 MU Women's News  – Manchester United Official Website
 MU Women's Videos – Manchester United Official Website

 
2018 establishments in England
Association football clubs established in 2018
Women's football clubs in England
Women's Championship (England) teams
Football clubs in Manchester